"Seven Whole Days" is a song performed by American singer Toni Braxton. It serves as the third single from her self-titled debut album (1993). It was released on October 8, 1993 by LaFace and Arista Records. Written and produced by Kenneth Edmonds, Antonio Reid and Daryl Simmons, the track describes a romance that was fading. As the single was not commercially released in the United States, it was ineligible to chart on the Billboard Hot 100, and only managed to chart on the Hot 100 Airplay at number forty-eight in early March 1994. Nevertheless, it successfully topped the Hot R&B/Hip-Hop Airplay in late January 1994.

"Seven Whole Days" is featured on The Essential Toni Braxton and Playlist: The Very Best of Toni Braxton.

Critical reception
In his review of Toni Braxton, John Martinucci from the Gavin Report found that Braxton "creates steamy sensuality" with "Seven Whole Days". Caroline Sullivan from The Guardian noted the singer's "a boys-beware growl" on the "easy-going" track. Pan-European magazine Music & Media wrote that it "could melt even the North Pole." Ralph Tee from Music Weeks RM Dance Update stated that it is "the closest Toni gets to Anita Baker territory vocally." Mike Joyce from The Washington Post felt the song "have a depth".    

Music video
The official music video for "Seven Whole Days" was shot while Braxton was on tour with her four sisters Traci, Towanda, Trina and Tamar featured as background singers. It was released in 1993 and directed by Lionel C. Martin. The video was later released on Braxton's VEVO channel on October 25, 2009, and is in both color and black and white. It had generated more than 19 million views as of October 2021.

Track listing
 US Vinyl, 12", 33 ⅓ RPM (73008-24063-1)
A1	"Seven Whole Days" (Ghetto Vibe) – 6:35
A2	"Seven Whole Days" (Ghetto Vibe Instrumental) – 6:36
B1	"Seven Whole Days" (Album Version) – 6:22
B2	"Seven Whole Days" (Live Version) – 6:15
B3	"The Christmas Song" – 3:25

 US Promo CD' (LFPCD-4062)
"Seven Whole Days" (Radio Edit) – 4:42
"Seven Whole Days" (Live Radio Edit) – 4:42
"Seven Whole Days" (Album Version) – 6:22
"Seven Whole Days" (Live Version) – 6:15
"Seven Whole Days" (Ghetto Vibe) – 6:35
"Seven Whole Days" (Quiet Mix) – 6:12
"The Christmas Song (Chestnuts Roasting on an Open Fire)" – 3:25

Credits and personnel
Credits taken from Discogs website.
 Performers and musicians
Toni Braxton - Vocals, Background
Keisha Jackson - Background (tracks 1–6)
Pamela Copeland - Background (tracks 1–6)
Tammy Davis - Background (tracks 1–6)

 Technical personnel
A&R - Bryant Reid
Engineer - Jim "Z" Zumpano
Engineer, Mixing and Programming - John Frye (tracks 1–6)
Executive Producer - L.A Reid and Babyface (tracks 1–6)
Written by - L.A Reid and Babyface (tracks 1–6)
Published By - ECAF, Sony Songs Inc., Cuff Link Music, Edwin H. Morris & Co.

Charts

Cover versions
In 2002, bassist Michael Manson presented his version from his album "The Bottom Line." Saxophonist Steve Cole is a special guest on this song.

References

1990s ballads
1993 singles
Contemporary R&B ballads
Songs written by Babyface (musician)
Songs written by L.A. Reid
Toni Braxton songs
Song recordings produced by Babyface (musician)
1993 songs
Song recordings produced by L.A. Reid
Song recordings produced by Daryl Simmons
Arista Records singles
LaFace Records singles
Songs about heartache
Soul ballads